New Ground was a cricket ground in Norwich, Norfolk. The first recorded match on the ground was in 1829 when a Norfolk side played Suffolk in a non first-class match. The ground was the venue for two first-class matches, both against Yorkshire sides, one in 1834 and the other in 1836.

The final recorded match held on the ground came in 1888 between the Gentlemen of Norfolk and the Parsees cricket team during their 1888 tour of England.

References

External links
New Ground on Cricinfo

Defunct cricket grounds in England
Cricket grounds in Norfolk
Sports venues in Norwich
Defunct sports venues in Norfolk
Sports venues completed in 1829